Charles Bates is a former American football coach.  He was the 15th head football coach at Kentucky State University in Frankfort, Kentucky, serving for two seasons, from 1968 to 1969, and compiling a record of 2–15.

In 1972, Bates succeeded Alva Tabor as Southern University's 10th head football coach. After a tumultuous 2–7–1 start to his career at Southern, Bates and the Jaguars posted two eight-win seasons (1974, 1976) and a nine win-season in 1975 in which Southern captured a share of the Southwestern Athletic Conference SWAC title and won the Pelican Bowl over South Carolina State. After a rough 3–3–1 start to the 1977 season, Bates stepped down mid-season, and Ken Tillage took over coaching duties for the rest of the season.  During his tenure at Southern, Bates favored the Wishbone formation on offense.  Bates won 36 games as coach for Southern, losing 23, and tied twice for a winning percentage of .606. This percentage places Bates fourth behind Ace Mumford (.730), Brice Taylor (.725), and Pete Richardson (.688).

References

Year of birth missing (living people)
Living people
Kentucky State Thorobreds football coaches
Southern Jaguars football coaches
African-American coaches of American football
20th-century African-American sportspeople